The Emporia Gazette is a daily newspaper in Emporia, Kansas.

History
William Allen White bought the newspaper for $3,000 ($ in  dollars) in 1895. Through his editorship, over the next five decades, he became an iconic figure in American journalism and political life. The paper rose to national prominence and influence in the Republican Party following the 1896 publication of "What's the Matter With Kansas?", a White editorial that harshly criticized Populism and the Presidential campaign of William Jennings Bryan. White struck up a friendship with US President Theodore Roosevelt who stayed at the White home, called Red Rocks, during cross-country trips.

White won the 1923 Pulitzer Prize for his editorial, "To an Anxious Friend", after he was arrested for a free speech violation of a newly enacted law pushed by Kansas Governor Henry Justin Allen.  White's autobiography, published posthumously, won the 1947 Pulitzer Prize.

The newspaper is still published by the White family.

Besides owning The Emporia Gazette, The White family owns The St. Marys Star in St. Marys, Kansas, The Chase County Leader-News in Cottonwood Falls, Kansas, and as of 5 November 2013, The Westmoreland Recorder in Westmoreland, Kansas. The White Corporation added the Junction City Union, The Abilene Reflector-Chronicle and the Wamego Smoke Signal to its newspaper family in March 2016.

See also
 List of newspapers in Kansas
 William Allen White
 William Lindsay White

References

On May 1, 2018, Seaton Publishing Co, Inc. purchased the Junction City Daily Union and the Flint Hills Shopper.

External links

Emporia, Kansas
Newspapers published in Kansas